The Ritual of the Calling of an Engineer is a private ritual, authored by Rudyard Kipling, in which students about to graduate from an engineering program at a university in Canada are permitted to participate.  Participation may also be permitted for Canadian professional engineers and registered engineers-in-training who received training elsewhere. The ritual is administered by a body called The Corporation of the Seven Wardens. As part of the ritual each participant is conferred the Iron Ring.

History

The ritual traces its origins to professor H. E. T. Haultain of the University of Toronto, who believed and persuaded other members of the Engineering Institute of Canada that there needed to be a ceremony and standard of ethics developed for graduating engineers. This was in response to the Quebec Bridge Disaster in which 75 workmen died due to faulty engineering calculations and miscommunication. The ritual was created in 1922 by Rudyard Kipling at the request of Haultain, representing seven past-presidents of the Engineering Institute of Canada. The seven past-presidents were the original seven wardens of the corporation.

An inaugural ceremony was held in the evening of 25 April 1925, at the University Club of Montreal, when the obligation was taken by six engineers, some of whom were involved with Kipling in its development. On 1 May 1925, three of these newly obligated engineers met at the University of Toronto with a number of the officers of the Engineering Alumni Association and obligated 14 of them in the Senate Chamber of the university becoming the first local chapter (referred to as a camp) to do so. Fairbairn met with Harry F. McLean, president of Dominion Construction and Kipling in Montreal at the Ritz-Carlton Hotel to discuss the details of the ritual. Fairbairn later visited McLean at his home in Merrickville, Ontario, to secure a sizeable donation from McLean, philanthropist, on behalf of the Corporation of the Seven Wardens, the custodian and administrator of the ritual, to ensure its survival.

The Ritual and the conferring of the Iron Ring continues to be administered by The Corporation of the Seven Wardens Inc./Société des Sept Gardiens inc. through camps associated with the universities granting degrees in engineering in Canada.

Ritual
The ritual takes place separately at individual Camps across Canada usually situated near an engineering university. The ceremonies are separate, organised by one of 28 camps of the Corporation of the Seven Wardens for administrative purposes.

The Obligation, which is not an oath but a solemn expression of intention, is subscribed to at the ceremony. The Obligation essentially states the duties and responsibilities of the engineer. Following the Obligation, the Iron Ring is placed on the little finger of the working hand, and is worn by the engineer as a symbol and a reminder. As originally conceived, the engineer's iron ring rubs against the drawings and paper upon which the Engineer writes and even in modern times, serves as a reminder when working on a computer.

Previously, a biblical passage was quoted: 2 Esdras, Chapter 4, Verses 5-10. More generally today Kipling's poem, the Hymn of Breaking Strain is recited.

The Obligation is private, though not necessarily secret. However, it is customary for those who have gone through it to not discuss the details of the Calling with others, even engineers from other countries. The ceremony is open only to candidates, those who have already undergone the ritual and at some sites, guests invited by candidates.

As part of the preparation for the ritual, candidates are instructed not to discuss the details of the ritual with the media. A reminder of this is provided at the end of the ceremony in the form of a written instruction that states: "The Rule of Governance provides that there shall be no publicity in connection with the Ritual." 

Commemorating the 75th anniversary, the Ritual of the Calling of an Engineer domestic-rate stamp was issued on 25 April 2000. Designer Darrell Freeman's "head-to-foot" layout incorporates the symbolic iron ring that is presented as part of the ceremony. The ring also visually links the four engineering achievements featured on this stamp.

The Ritual of the Calling of an Engineer has a very simple purpose: To direct the newly qualified engineer toward a consciousness of the profession and its social significance and indicating to the more experienced engineer their responsibilities in welcoming and supporting the newer engineers when they are ready to enter the profession.

The ring symbolizes the pride which engineers have in their profession, while simultaneously reminding them of their humility. The ring serves as a reminder to the engineer and others of the engineer's obligation to live by a high standard of professional conduct.

Iron Ring

The Iron Ring may be made from either iron or stainless steel. Presently, only Camp One of the Corporation in Toronto continues to confer rings made from iron; stainless steel rings are conferred at all other locations across Canada. The Iron Ring does not certify a person as a Professional Engineer, which requires registration with a relevant professional organisation followed by examination and practical experience.

Management
The Corporation of the Seven Wardens (French: Société des Sept Gardiens) is the body that holds the rights and the duty to carry out The Ritual of the Calling of an Engineer. It is organised into 28 regional branches, called camps, numbered by order of establishment. The term camp is used to describe these regional branches because it conveys a smaller, close-knit sense of community.

See also
 Engineering traditions in Canada
 Order of the Engineer

Notes

References

Further reading

External links
 The Ritual of the Calling of an Engineer website
 Information Relevant to the Iron Ring Ceremony, compiled by Dr. J. Jeswiet, 22 November 2001. Retrieved 4 April 2010.
Archival papers are held at the University of Toronto Archives and Records Management Services

Engineering literature
Works by Rudyard Kipling
Rituals
1922 works
Canadian traditions